Temple Meir Chayim is a historic Jewish synagogue at 4th and Holly Streets in McGehee, Arkansas.  The two story brick building was built in 1947 to serve the Jewish community of McGehee, Dermott, and Eudora.  The building style is a restrained Romanesque Revival with Mission details.  It was the first synagogue in southeastern Arkansas, even though there had been a Jewish presence in the area since the early 19th century.

The building was listed on the National Register of Historic Places in 1999.

See also
National Register of Historic Places listings in Desha County, Arkansas

References

Synagogues in Arkansas
Buildings and structures in Desha County, Arkansas
National Register of Historic Places in Desha County, Arkansas
Properties of religious function on the National Register of Historic Places in Arkansas
Synagogues on the National Register of Historic Places
Synagogues completed in 1947
1947 establishments in Arkansas
Romanesque Revival architecture in Arkansas
Romanesque Revival synagogues